Porcellionides pruinosus is a cosmopolitan woodlouse that is native to Europe, and is suspected to consist of very closely related species. Ten subspecies are recognised. The species carries Wolbachia endosymbionts, which is an alpha-proteobacterium that is known to modify the reproduction of their crustacean hosts by inducing cytoplasmic incompatibility or feminisation.

See also
List of woodlice of the British Isles

Porcellionides pruinosus as a pet
Since it is easy to keep, the species is bred as a food source for pets or as a pet itself. There are now numerous color forms such as "Orange", "Powder Orange", "White Out", "Oreo Crumble", "Red Koi" and "Powder Blue", although this is the nominate form. Some cultivated forms are traded for high prices by breeders.

References

External links
Images of Porcellionides pruinosus on Bug Guide

Porcellionidae
Crustaceans described in 1833
Woodlice of Europe